Beverley Lyons is a Scottish entertainment journalist, vlogger and broadcaster.

She heads up lifestyle and entertainment website theshowbizlion.com and was digital Showbiz editor at The Daily Record.

She created Clubber Of The Week in the Glasgow Evening Times and wrote a daily showbiz and lifestyle column there. 
She founded the daily Razz pages for the Scottish Daily Record newspaper covering entertainment as showbiz editor, until leaving in 2016. She subsequently set up her own media and digital PR company, TheShowbizLion.com to write daily for the national titles.

Lyons is a regular BBC Scotland contributor and was guest presenter on STV 2’s Live At Five. She was a guest host on The MusicMatch for BBC Radio Scotland. She was team captain on BBC Scotland radio show "Famous For Five Minutes", with comedians Craig Hill and Frankie Boyle. 

She holds a LAMDA certificate.  She has voiced advertisements for The Scottish Chill Out Album, Julienne Taylor's album Music Garden and Irn Bru carnival. Lyons was nominated at the 2009 Scottish Press Awards for "Entertainment Journalist" and "Multimedia Journalist" of The Year; she was runner-up in the latter category. Nominated again for Scottish Press "Multimedia Journalist" in 2010, she received the "New Media Journalist Of The Year" in 2011. She also Holds the title of Trinity Mirror’s Digital Journalist of the Year.

Lyons, who was born on February 27 1976, is the daughter of late radio producer Ben Lyons and promoter Louise Rosenthal.  Her sister Yvette is a producer-director.

References

1973 births
Living people
Scottish journalists
Scottish women journalists